Cathérine Mathevon (born 22 August 1963) is a French sprint canoeist who competed in the mid-1980s. She finished sixth in the K-2 500 m event at the 1984 Summer Olympics in Los Angeles.

References
Sports-Reference.com profile

External links

1963 births
Canoeists at the 1984 Summer Olympics
French female canoeists
Living people
Olympic canoeists of France
Place of birth missing (living people)